JOO or Joo may refer to:

 Joo (singer), South Korean singer
 Joo (Korean name)

See also
 Jew (disambiguation)
 Jōō (disambiguation)